Herbert Sumney (March 11, 1870 – November 21, 1935) was an American golfer. He competed in the men's individual event at the 1904 Summer Olympics.

References

1870 births
1935 deaths
Amateur golfers
American male golfers
Olympic golfers of the United States
Golfers at the 1904 Summer Olympics
People from DeKalb County, Illinois
Sportspeople from Illinois